Uly Dala Qyrandary (literally Eagles of the Great Steppe) is a Kazakh political organisation that was founded on 12 October 2011. The organization is engaged in the development of cultural and national values in the country. It is led by Kazakh writer and politician Sadybek Tügel who was the candidate for the movement in the 2019 Kazakh presidential election. Tugel won 0.92% of the vote and took last place in the race.

References 

Political advocacy groups in Kazakhstan
Political movements in Kazakhstan
Organizations established in 2011
2011 establishments in Kazakhstan